The Collection is a greatest hits album by British band Ultravox, released on 2 November 1984 by Chrysalis Records. It includes all fourteen of the band's hit singles on Chrysalis from 1980 to 1984, including "Love's Great Adventure", released ahead of the album as a stand-alone single.

The album peaked at number 2 on the UK Album Chart, becoming their highest-charting album. It also became their best-selling album, being certified triple platinum by the British Phonographic Industry (BPI) for shipments in excess of 900,000 copies.

Track listing

Side one
All lyrics by Midge Ure, except where noted.

Track listing

Side two
All lyrics by Midge Ure, except where noted.

Track listing

The 12″ Collection
Initial copies of the vinyl album included a limited-edition bonus disc titled The 12″ Collection, consisting of three extended remixes and three 12″ extended mixes:

Side one:
 "Dancing with Tears in My Eyes" (Special Re-mix) – 10:02
 "Serenade" (Special Re-mix) – 6:03 (music: Currie, Ure, Cross)
 "One Small Day" (Final Mix) – 7:45

Side two:
 "Love's Great Adventure" (Extended Version) – 5:40
 "We Came to Dance" (Extended Version) – 7:35
 "Reap the Wild Wind" (Extended Version) – 4:45 

Initial copies of the cassette tape release also included these additional six tracks; three located at the end of each side.

Charts

Weekly charts

Year-end charts

Certifications

References

Bibliography

 

1984 compilation albums
Chrysalis Records compilation albums
Ultravox compilation albums